Nirbhoya is a 2018 Bengali film directed by Milan Bhowmik and produced by Sanjib Samaddar under the banner of Sambit Media and Productions. The film is based on the 2012 Delhi gang rape case. Apart from West Bengal, the film will also be released in other states like Orissa, Assam and Bihar. Another version of the film, dubbed in Hindi script editing in Hindi done by Sudeshu Shivam will also be released.

Cast 

 Meghali as Nirbhaya
 Raaj Bhowmik as Nirbhaya's friend
 Jaysree
 Amrapali
 Riya
 Soumitra Chatterjee as the Chief Minister
 Sreelekha Mitra
 Badshah Maitra
 Mrinal Mukherjee
 Ashish Vidyarthi as a police officer
 Rajesh Sharma
 Biplab Chatterjee
 Ramen Roychowdhury
 Gouri Shankar Panda
 Subhasish Mukhopadhyay
 Kalyan Chatterjee

Production

Making 
In an interview, Ashish Vidyarthi said that the director of Nirbhoya was inspired to make this film after he read a report of a rape and mutilation of a victim of South Africa soon after the Delhi incident. The victim of the rape was a 23-year-old trainee physiotherapist whose real name was Jyoti Singh, but she came to be known as Nirbhaya, meaning "fearless". However, during a press meet at the Press Club Kolkata, director Milan Bhowmik said that the film is not based on the Delhi rape case, but actually on the present scenario of our society. He added that the film will create a sense of responsibility among his viewers. The mahurat of Nirbhoya was held at the Floatel Hotel in Kolkata on 11 February 2013.

According to the director, the aim of the film is to make the people aware that anti-rape laws or street protests alone cannot prevent the repetition of such a dangerous event. Though the incident was set in Delhi, the characters of the film would be based in West Bengal. The film is also the first project of the production house, Sambit Media and Productions.

Filming 
Filming of Nirbhoya started on 5 February 2013  and was completed by April 2013. There will be sequences in the film where the bus will be passing through various streets of New Delhi and police checkpoints. There will be various sub-plots depicting diverse types of sexual crimes. Some action sequences are also in the film, shot with the assistance and supervision of fight director Judo Ramu.

Casting 
The film will introduce many newcomers, including Raaj, Meghali, Jaysree, Amrapali and Riya, who will play important roles representing the awakening of the younger generation. Every female character in the film will be the victim of various dangerous incidents.

Soundtrack 
Arunava Chakrabarty composed the film score for Nirbhoya. The playback singers include Shreya Ghoshal and Shaan. It was reported that the soundtrack will consists of around three songs. NDTV also reported that will not be much songs in the film.

See also 
 Satyagraha

References

External links 

Films about women in India
2018 films
Bengali-language Indian films
2010s Bengali-language films